William Henry Strauss (6 January 1916 – 16 November 1984) was a South African professional footballer.

An outside left, Strauss played for Aberdeen between 1935 and 1946 and Plymouth Argyle between 1946 and 1953.

At Aberdeen, he played a role in the club's run to the 1937 Scottish Cup Final but received an injury in the semi-final and could not take part in the showpiece event, which resulted in defeat to Celtic.

During the war years he made 2 guest appearances for Clapton Orient in 1941–42.

At Plymouth, he made 166 appearances in all competitions during his time at Home Park, scoring 42 goals, before retiring in 1953 at the age of 37.

Strauss also played Minor Counties Championship matches for Devon from 1950 to 1951, scoring a century in 1950 at The Oval against Surrey Second XI.

He died in Plymouth on 16 November 1984.

References
Neilson N. Kaufman, historian Leyton Orient, on 15 October 2014

External links
 Profile at Post War English & Scottish Football League A - Z Player's Transfer Database

1916 births
1984 deaths
South African soccer players
Association football wingers
Aberdeen F.C. players
Plymouth Argyle F.C. players
South African emigrants to the United Kingdom
Scottish Football League players
English Football League players
South African cricketers
Devon cricketers
Sportspeople from Gauteng
South African expatriate soccer players
Expatriate footballers in Scotland
Expatriate footballers in England
South African expatriate sportspeople in Scotland
South African expatriate sportspeople in England
People from Benoni